Tencent Maps is a desktop and web mapping service application and technology provided by Tencent, offering satellite imagery, street maps, street view and historical view perspectives, as well as functions such as a route planner for traveling by foot, car, or with public transportation. Android and iOS versions are available.

The online version of Tencent Map is available only in the Chinese language and offers maps only of mainland China, Hong Kong, Macau, and Taiwan, with the rest of the world appearing unexplored.

On September 26, 2014, Tencent Map announced that maps of Japan, South Korea, Thailand and Taiwan were launched for the mobile version. These locations (except Taiwan) are not available on the web version as of July 2017.

Tencent Maps partner with NavInfo for China market and MapKing for Hong Kong market.

Street view service 
The street view service of Tencent Maps was first launched in 2011, but later stopped because of restrictions on geographic data in China. It was relaunched on December 13, 2012.

Timeline of introductions

References

External links 
 

Tencent
Web mapping
Web Map Services
Street view services